is a private university in Ashiya, Hyōgo, Japan, founded in 1964.

External links 
  in Japanese
 Guinness World Records - Fastest solar-powered vehicle

Private universities and colleges in Japan
Educational institutions established in 1964
Ashiya University
1964 establishments in Japan